Germain Mbiyavanga Kapela (born 19 May 2002) is a French footballer who plays as a defender for Chambly B.

Career 
Kapela was a product of the Reims youth academy, before moving to Chambly in 2020. He made his professional debut with Chambly in a 1-0 Ligue 2 loss to Clermont on 13 February 2021.

References

External links

2002 births
Living people
French footballers
French sportspeople of Democratic Republic of the Congo descent
Association football defenders
Ligue 2 players
FC Chambly Oise players
FC Chamalières players
Black French sportspeople